The Kingston Voyageurs were a Junior "A" ice hockey team from Kingston, Ontario, Canada.  They were a part of the Ontario Junior A Hockey League.

History
The Voyageurs entered the Metro Junior B Hockey League in 1974.  The Voyageurs filled the Junior "B" void left when the Kingston Frontenacs jumped from the Eastern Junior B Hockey League in 1972 to the Ontario Provincial Junior A Hockey League and then the Ontario Major Junior Hockey League in 1973 as the Kingston Canadians.

The Voyageurs continued with the league when it became the Metro Junior A Hockey League in 1991 and stuck around until 1995.  In 1995, the team jumped to the Ontario Provincial Junior A Hockey League. The Vees were bought in the summer of 2006 by their major sponsor Gregg Rosen from KIMCO Steel Sales Ltd., who promptly spent more money to fix up the teams existing dressing room, build an office above the dressing room for the coaching staff and buy the players new equipment and sticks among other things. The Voyageurs currently play out of the new $24.5 million Invista Centre, located on Fortune Crescent, near Highway 401 and Gardiners Road.

On April 14, 2009, the Voyageurs won their first Buckland Trophy defeating the Oakville Blades in 5 games.  On April 25, 2009, the Voyageurs defeated the Fort William North Stars 4–1 to capture the first Dudley Hewitt Cup in team history.  By virtue of the win the Voyageurs qualified for the 2009 Royal Bank Cup.  They played their first game of the tournament on May 3 against the host Victoria Grizzlies.  They finished in fourth place in the tournament.

In 2011, due to Gregg Rosen being diagnosed with cancer, the team was sold to a group that included Colin Birkas, the head coach of the Greater Kingston Jr. Frontenacs.  Evan Robinson was relieved of his head coaching duties and Birkas replaced him.  As well, the general manager duties were assumed by Denis Duchesne.  During the summer of 2014, Duchesne was relieved of his duties as general manager and the role was filled on an interim basis by Birkas and Rick Poirier.  Poirier retired from the team shortly before Christmas 2014.  Toward the end of the 2014–15 season, Birkas was suspended for an infraction during a game against the Wellington Dukes, causing assistants Ben Munroe and Dan Clarke to assume the coaching duties.  Birkas' suspension was for the balance of the 2014–15 season, the playoffs, and the entire 2015–16 season.  Despite this, the Voyageurs rallied and managed to have a magical 2015 playoff run.  This was highlighted by a comeback from being down 0–3 against the Aurora Tigers to win in seven games, as well as taking the defending champion Toronto Lakeshore Patriots to Game 7 in the Buckland Cup finals.

Over the Summer of 2015, former assistant coach Peter Goulet was hired as the team's general manager, with Goulet leaving the CCHL's Nepean Raiders in the process. Goulet hired his old assistant coach Taurean White to be the head coach, while also bring in former Kingston Frontenac and NHLer Mark Major and ex-Vee Phil Mangan as assistant coaches. Video Coach Fraser MacAlpine was promoted to Assistant GM. The Vees went on to finish 3rd in the OJHL overall standings, sweeping Cobourg Cougars and Markham Royals in the playoffs before being swept themselves by the eventual Buckland Cup and Dudley Hewitt champions Trenton Golden Hawks.

In the 2016–17 season, the Vees iced a skilled and younger team than in years previous. Despite a winning record playing in the tough East Division, Taurean White was relieved of his duties after the Christmas break. Mark Major took over the head coach job on an interim basis, with new assistant coaches Patrick Shearer and Rob Ridgley on the bench. The Vees would finish last in the East Division, despite finishing with the 8th best record in the league but would be swept by the Royal Bank Cup champions Cobourg Cougars, ending the Vees 15-year first-round winning streak and their 10-year conference finals appearance streak.

Over the summer of 2017, GM Goulet left the ECHL's Brampton Beast to become the new head coach. Under Goulet, the Vees finished 2nd in the East Division, 8 points back of the Wellington Dukes and 4th in the NorthEast Conference with a record of 31-19-2-2. Brandon Nadeau, Rob Clerc, Josh Leblanc, Cole Beckstead and Reid Russell all hit the 100 point plateau in their Vees careers. The Vees faced Cobourg Cougars for the 3rd straight season in the opening round of the playoffs, losing in 5 games.

In the 2018–19 season, the Vees saw their playoff streak of 32 years come to an end with a record of 22-25-2-5 to finish 5th in the East Division. At the end of the season, the Ontario Junior Hockey League board approved the sale of the Voyageurs to the owners of the Ontario Hockey League Barrie Colts, becoming the Collingwood Colts, ending the 43 year tradition of Voyageurs junior hockey in Kingston

Season-by-season results

Playoffs
MetJHL Years
1990 Lost Semi-final
Kingston Voyageurs defeated Wellington Dukes 4-games-to-3
Wexford Raiders defeated Kingston Voyageurs 4-games-to-none
1991 Lost Quarter-final
Kingston Voyageurs defeated Markham Thunderbirds 2-games-to-1
Wexford Raiders defeated Kingston Voyageurs 4-games-to-1
1992 Lost Quarter-final
Wexford Raiders defeated Kingston Voyageurs 4-games-to-1
1993 Lost Preliminary
Richmond Hill Riot defeated Kingston Voyageurs 3-games-to-none
1994 Lost Quarter-final
Wexford Raiders defeated Kingston Voyageurs 4-games-to-1
1995 Lost Quarter-final
Thornhill Islanders defeated Kingston Voyageurs 4-games-to-none
OJHL Years

Staff
 Owner - Community Sports Entertainment Ltd.
 Owner - Dr. Dijana Oliver
 Owner - Rob Zarichny
 General Manager/Head Coach - Peter Goulet
 Assistant coach - Mark Major
 Assistant coach - Brandon Nadeau
 Video coach - Josh Hardiman
 Goalie Coach- Tom Hertz
 Trainer - William Wilson
 Equipment Manager - Terry Burrows
 Play-by-Play Host/Social Media - Allan Etmanski

Retired numbers
 #2 Anthony Geldart
 #8 Daniel Cleary
 #10 Scott Martin
 #24 Ryan Vince

Notable alumni
 Alyn McCauley - (Los Angeles Kings)
 Jay McClement - (St. Louis Blues)
 Kirk Muller  - (Montreal Canadiens) - (Stanley Cup Champion 1993)
 Doug Gilmour - (Calgary Flames) -  (Stanley Cup Champion 1989)
 Bob Wren  - (Toronto Maple Leafs)
 Mike Smith - (Phoenix Coyotes)
 Nate Robinson - (Detroit Red Wings)
 Marc Moro - (Toronto Maple Leafs)
 Scott Arniel - (Buffalo Sabres)
 Daniel Cleary - (Detroit Red Wings) - (Stanley Cup Champion 2008)
 Brandon Convery - (Toronto Maple Leafs)
 Todd MacDonald - (Florida Panthers)
 Rik Wilson - (St. Louis Blues)
 Patrick Ashton - (EV Landsberg)
 Jeff Foster - (Milwaukee Admirals)
 Brett Gibson - (Pensacola Ice Pilots)
 Tim Keyes - (Syracuse Crunch)
 Adam McAllister - (Tulsa Oilers)
 Christoffer Kjærgaard - Danish national team
 Scott Harrington - (Toronto Marlies)
 Francesco Vilardi - (Flint Firebirds)

External links
Vees Webpage
OPJHL League Website

Ontario Provincial Junior A Hockey League teams
Sport in Kingston, Ontario
1974 establishments in Ontario
Ice hockey clubs established in 1974